John Geesnell Lim Yap II (born October 16, 1977), more known in Bohol as "Baba", is a Filipino politician and was the mayor of Tagbilaran, Bohol, Philippines from 2013 to 2022 until he was succeeded by his wife Jane Yap.

Early life and education
Yap, born John Geesnell Lim Yap II, is the second son of John U. Yap and Geesnell N. Lim.

He finished his elementary at Holy Spirit School of Tagbilaran in 1989 and secondary at Divine Word College of Tagbilaran, now Holy Name University in 1993. He took up accountancy at the University of San Carlos in Cebu City. He became the chief accountant of their family business at Bohol Tropics Resort Club  and owns a nightclub called Lazer Party Club in Tagbilaran City.

Yap is married to Jane Censoria Cajes, a former Sangguniang Kabataan Bohol provincial president and national president. They have one daughter Janah Geesnell.

Political career
Yap's first stint in politics began when he was elected as city councilor of Tagbilaran City during the 2010 Elections. 

In 2013, he ran for mayor and won against lawyer Agustinus Gonzaga of the Liberal and Dr Abraham N. Lim (UNA), the brother of then outgoing mayor, Dan Lim. At the age of 35, he became the youngest city mayor of Tagbilaran. 
He ran again in 2016 election and won. 

On May 13, 2019, Yap was reelected for 3rd consecutive term and won via landslide.

Awards
Ranked 2nd on the top performing mayors in the Central Visayas (2021), by RP- Mission and Development Foundation Inc. (RPMD). 
CSC PAGASA Award (Regional and National Awardee) for Outstanding Public Servants(2019)

References

National Unity Party (Philippines) politicians
People from Tagbilaran
1977 births
Living people
Mayors of places in Bohol
University of San Carlos alumni
Filipino city and municipal councilors